Cape Haze is a peninsula located in Charlotte County, Florida that is approximately  long. It includes the Wildflower Preserve, once used as a golf course, and the Cape Haze Pioneer Trail.

References

Headlands of Florida
Landforms of Charlotte County, Florida
Peninsulas of Florida